Myron K. Brakke (October 23, 1921 - June 15, 2007) was an American biochemist and microbiologist who is primarily known for the development of sucrose density-gradient centrifugation as well as his work on viruses and macromolecules. He was elected to the National Academy of Sciences in 1974.

References

1921 births
2007 deaths
American biochemists
Members of the United States National Academy of Sciences